Chrysostomides or Chrysostomidis is a surname of Greek-language origin. The feminine form is Chrysostomidou. Notable people with the surname include:

Julian Chrysostomides (1928–2008), Greek historian
Kypros Chrysostomides (1942–2022), Cypriot politician

Greek-language surnames